Piotr Grudzień (born 27 September 1991) is a Polish para table tennis player who competes in international level events. He is a Paralympic and World champion and a multiple European medalist in team events. He has won medals alongside Patryk Chojnowski and his training partner Marcin Skrzynecki.

References

External links
 
 

1991 births
Living people
Paralympic table tennis players of Poland
Table tennis players at the 2008 Summer Paralympics
Table tennis players at the 2012 Summer Paralympics
Table tennis players at the 2020 Summer Paralympics
Table tennis players at the 2016 Summer Paralympics
Medalists at the 2008 Summer Paralympics
Medalists at the 2012 Summer Paralympics
Medalists at the 2016 Summer Paralympics
People from Wołomin
People from Zielona Góra
Polish male table tennis players